The international Bühler Bluegrass Festival is an annual music festival in Bühl (Baden), Germany. Since 2003, it usually takes place in April or May. Each year, there are four to seven bands from the US, Canada and Europe. The musical spectrum ranges from oldtime, bluegrass and folk to Americana.  

Since 2011, the city of Bühl has been the organizer of the festival. In the years before, the city of Bühl and the cabaret „Kleinkunst im Schütte-Keller“ were co-organizers. Walter Fuchs, a radio-host and author, moderated the program until 2015. His son, Patrick Fuchs, took over the artistic direction and moderation in 2016.

Due to the positive response from the audience the festival, which was limited to one day until 2008, now takes place on two days (with one exception in 2003 when it was for one day only). Since 2017, the first festival day takes place on the grounds of the main sponsor. The second day of the festival remains in the Bürgerhaus Neuer Markt.

The concept of the festival also includes an open-air event on the Johannesplatz in the Bühler city center on Saturday morning.

Past dates & bands/artists

History 
The precursor of the Bühler event was the Güglingen Bluegrass Festival, an annual music festival held from 1986 to 2001 in Güglingen near Heilbronn. It soon became the most important bluegrass festival in continental Europe. The most famous bands in the American bluegrass scene that performed in Güglingen were The Nashville Bluegrass Band, Country Gazette, The Tony Rice Unit, Laurie Lewis & Grant Street and Tim O'Brien & the O'Boys. The Güglingen Bluegrass Festival took place for the last time in 2001 – not because of a lack of audience response, but because of organizational problems.

In 2003, Bluegrass and country music expert Walter Fuchs, the former mayor of the city of Bühl Hans Striebel, the city manager of the culture department Hans Störk, and Rüdiger Schmitt from the cabaret „Schütte-Keller” launched the International Bühler Bluegrass Festival after one year of preparation. For the first time it took place in Bühl on April 12, 2003. The festival is the most important event for bluegrass folk and americana music in the entire German-speaking region.

Bluegrass festivals